The Battle of Vilnius was a battle which took place on 16 April 1702 in Vilnius, the capital of the Grand Duchy of Lithuania, during the Great Northern War.

Background 
After having seen the city early seized by the Swedish army, the Grand Notary of Lithuania, Ludwik Konstanty Pociej launched a surprise attack with 3,000 men, although some sources state as few as 2,000 and others 4,000 men. They were equally matched by the Swedes with 3,000 men under Carl Gustav Mörner stationed inside the city, although due to intense sickness it was realistically closer to 2,500. The Dala regiment alone had only 740 men prior to the battle in comparison to its original strength of 1,200.

Battle 
The attack was repulsed and the Polish-Lithuanian army had to withdraw with a loss of 100 men killed and two cannons lost while the Swedes lost 50 men killed in the action.

Aftermath 
The city remained in Swedish control until Mörner left it with his army in order to reinforce Charles XII in his battle against Augustus. It was later recaptured by the Swedish general Carl Gustaf Dücker in 1706.

References
Notes

Bibliography
 
 

Vilnius 1702
Vilnius 1702
Vilnius 1702
Vilnius 1702
Military history of Vilnius